Loc'd Out is rapper Goldie Loc's second solo album which was released by 33rd Street Records on March 15, 2005

Track listing
 "Gangstas Keep Bumpin They Head" (featuring Kokane and Lebo)
 "New Dice City" (featuring Lebo)
 "Hood Treasury" (featuring Lebo)
 "Future Before Funeral"
 "Railroading"
 "Bang to Da Boogie" (featuring Tray Deee)
 "Glitter Ain't Gold" (featuring Tray Deee, E-White & Delano)
 "Die for You" (featuring J Girl and Bokie Loc)
 "Take You for a Ride" (featuring Bokie Loc)
 "You Don't Know Me Like That" (featuring Lebo)
 "The After Party"
 "Kill a Holiday" (featuring Seven and Boo-Ru)
 "Freak Illusions" (featuring Young Sagg)
 "Keep It Gangsta" (featuring Young Duz and T-Sagg)
 "Bonus Track" (featuring Bokie Loc and Jayo Felony)

2005 albums
Goldie Loc albums
33rd Street Records albums